Jurupa may refer to;

 Jurupa, a Native American village in Southern California; see 
 Jurupa, a variety of common fig
 Rancho Jurupa, an 1838 Mexican land grant in Southern California
 Jurupa Valley, California, or the Jurupa Hills neighborhood within that city
 Jurupa Valley High School

See also
 
 
 Jurupa Hills (disambiguation)
 Jurupari River in Brazil
 Jurupará State Park in Brazil